The Spanish airlift of 1936 was a military operation, carried out by the Nationalists during the early phase of the Spanish Civil War. It did not have any specific code name. Its objective was to bypass the Republican naval blockade of the Strait of Gibraltar and transport by air the soldiers stationed in the Spanish Morocco to the rebel-controlled part of Andalusia. The undertaking was hugely successful; during 85 days between July 19 and October 11 the Nationalists transported at least 14,000 men and at least 270 tons of war materiel. The success was possible thanks to German and Italian assistance, as aircraft sent by Hitler and Mussolini carried most of the troops and equipment. The operation is viewed as innovative, as it was the first ever large-scale military transport by air. Since there was no major Republican counter-action, the airlift was a challenge in terms of logistics and technology rather than combat. The opinion prevailing in historiography is that the airlift was vital for the Nationalists and helped to turn the failed coup into a long-lasting civil war.

Background

The coup of July 1936 commenced in the Spanish Morocco; on July 17 the rebels easily gained control of most of the protectorate, suffocating remaining islands of resistance on July 18. However, on the peninsula the coup was far less successful; on July 18 the insurgents gained rather shaky control over Seville and Córdoba, while the situation remained unclear in Cádiz, Granada, Huelva and Málaga. During the evening of that day, a few hundred rebel Morocco-stationed troops boarded the destroyer Churruca, which in the early hours of July 19 transported them to Cádiz, greatly contributing to the full rebel takeover of the city. However, on her way back, the Churruca's officers were overpowered by the crew. Other warships loyal to the government were deployed in the Strait of Gibraltar, blocking any would-be further transport of the rebels by sea. The southern tip of the peninsula, ranging from Cádiz to Seville, was now firmly controlled by the insurgents; however, they were isolated and in danger of being overrun. Francisco Franco arrived in Morocco on the morning of July 19 and took command of the troops. Since the protectorate was fully controlled, the battle-hardened Army of Africa was not required there; instead, the rebels needed the troops badly in Andalusia. As sea transport no longer remained an option, the decision to commence airlift was spontaneously taken during a meeting of high commanders, presided by Franco.

Early phase

During the early days of the rebellion, there were very few aircraft available for organizing an airlift from Morocco to Andalusia. 3 Fokkers F-VII were seized either at the Seville airport or in Larache, and 2 military Dornier J Wal seaplanes remained at the Cádiz naval base. One Fokker transported troops from the Sania Ramel airfield in Tetuan to the Tablada airport in Seville already on the evening of July 19, and soon all 5 aircraft were engaged. The transport capacity was very limited: neither the Fokker nor Dornier could have accommodated more than 15 troops. The first unit airlifted was 17. Company of the 5. Bandera of the Foreign Legion, reassembled in Andalusia on July 20. The same day, a Lufthansa Ju 52 postal plane flying from Gambia made an intermediary landing in the Canary Islands; the pilot was forced to fly to Tetuan, but instead of joining the airlift he carried Franco's mission to Berlin. On July 25, the Nationalists seized a Douglas DC-2; this increased the maximum daily transport capacity to some 130 men. Aware of his insufficient means, on July 23, Franco cabled Hitler and Mussolini requesting transport aircraft; he also sent his personal envoys to Berlin and Rome. They managed to see Hitler on July 25, the same day the German dictator agreed to provide assistance, code-named Feuerzauber. Mussolini was less decisive, but within 48 hours he independently decided to do the same thing.

German and Italian buildup

The first Junkers 52 machine sent by the Nazis arrived in Tetuan on July 28; others arrived during next few days. Following some time dedicated to maintenance etc., the first Ju 52 joined the airlift on July 29. When operated as a regular passenger plane, a Junkers would normally carry 17 passengers; with all seats removed, 35 densely-packed soldiers were able to sit on the floor. The aircraft was large enough also to accommodate howitzers and artillery pieces with total load up to 3.5 tons. On July 30, the first Italian Savoia-Marchetti 81 machines landed in Nador from Sardinia. They were powerful aircraft, with slightly larger capacity than that of the Junkers. Other Ju 52 and SM 81 aircraft started to arrive during the first days of August. Whereas the Junkers either came aboard a ship to Cádiz or flew via Italy, the Savoias flew directly from Sardinia. Their fleet was complete by August 10, with 20 Junkers and 12 Savoias in place. Though unarmed, they were manned and serviced by German and Italian military pilots and technicians. Up to this moment, during 22 days of the airlift, there were reportedly already some 5,000 troops carried by air across the straits; probably around a half were transported by the Luftwaffe (in comparison, so-called Convoy de la Victoria got 1,600 men transported by sea on August 5 only).

In full swing: average transport rates

On August 10, Franco had 38 aircraft at his disposal: 20 Junkers, 12 Savoias, 3 Fokkers, 2 Dorniers and 1 Douglas. This fleet would come to operate the airlift during the following 2 months, though some of them would be gradually withdrawn. With each aircraft making one round-trip daily, in total, they were supposedly capable of carrying either 1,000 men or 100 tons per day. However, these figures were purely theoretical and actual daily transport rates were much lower. Not all machines were always available; every day even up to half of them were undergoing repair, maintenance or waiting for spare parts. There were also acute fuel shortages. In practice, once the full fleet was assembled, on average, there were some 250 soldiers and 5 tons of materiel carried per day. Depending upon circumstances the figures varied. According to detailed German records, some weekly Luftwaffe figures were (first men, then tons): 700/11.6 (3rd week of August), 1,275/35 (4th week of August), 1,200/37 (1st week of September), 1,400/49 (2nd week of September), 1,120/39 (3rd week of September) and 1,550/68 (4th week of September). One German pilot recollected that his daily record was 241 soldiers flown. The proportion between men and equipment differed. Initially, priority was given to soldiers, and later there were weeks of increased materiel payload; the record one was the week in September, when 69 tons were carried by air across the straits.

Modus operandi

Initially, the flights were taking place between Tetuan and Seville (200 km). However, once the airfield in Jérez de la Frontera had been restored to use in early August, flights from Morocco were re-directed there (140 km). This allowed them to make savings on fuel. Because of their low cruising speed, the Dornier seaplanes were employed on the route from Ceuta to Algeciras (30 km); as they were wearing out quickly, later they were withdrawn from service altogether. Normally a one-way flight took around one hour to Seville and 40 minutes to Jerez. Aircraft were usually flying at an altitude of 2,500-3,000 meters, mostly to avoid fire from anti-aircraft guns mounted on Republican warships patrolling the straits. Protection was initially provided by Nieuport Ni-52 machines, stationed in Larache and Tetuan. Later they were joined by German Heinkel H-51 and by Italian Fiat CR 32 fighters. As it was inefficient to provide cover for a single aircraft, transport planes were usually flying in a group. Most aircraft were flying a number of round-trip flights per day. One source claims that when in service, an average Junkers was doing 3-4 rounds daily. However, given that there were 868 two-way flights done by Luftwaffe and recorded until October 11, the daily average per aircraft is around 0.6. This suggests that days of intense flying were interchanging with days spent on the ground, when a plane was undergoing maintenance, repairs and refueling.

Problems

The largest single problem was shortages of fuel. Some amount was available in stocks; efforts were made to purchase as much as possible from the Portuguese and from the British in Gibraltar; Some quantities were delivered by German tankers. Improvised measures involved blending air fuel with various fluids, typically benzol, and then rolling drums to make sure both components mixed up properly. With airport infrastructure not ready to handle so heavy traffic, in Jérez sherry pumps were used to refuel the aircraft; however, their speed was dramatically slow, some 3 liters per minute. Another major problem was the Saharan sand, responsible for excess wear out of hardware; there was no solution found, except covering the engines when idle. Extreme heat made maintenance service difficult during the day, and much work was carried out by night. Occasionally, the interiors of the aircraft had to be cleaned, as soldiers transported frequently went sick when airborne. The Republican air force proved to be the least of their problems. Though the Malaga air commander demanded “a good hunting squad” to be relocated to his airbase, the Republican air command did not react. There was not a single case of Republican aircraft attacking the Nationalist airlift. Exact losses are unclear; it is known that the Germans lost only 1 Junkers in an airfield collision. A few machines may have been lost by the Italians, though none in combat.

Dynamics

The dynamics of troops transport is highly unclear. Before the first German Junkers joined the airlift, planes available to the Nationalists might have carried few hundred men. In July, during 102 round-trips there were 837 men transported. One author claims that once the Germans and Italians joined the operation, until August 5, there were 1,500 men transported. According to one scholar “by the week of 10–16 August”, Luftwaffe planes alone carried 2,853 soldiers and 7,9 tons of equipment, but another one claims that “fifteen thousand men crossed in ten days”. A popular synthesis maintains vaguely that “in just a few weeks, over 13,000 soldiers had crossed the Strait of Gibraltar”. Another historian claims that by middle of August there were already 15,000 troops on the peninsula, while one more author writes that 15,000 had been flown by the end of August. These estimates imply an extraordinarily high daily average and suggest that during some 40 days of September and October there were only a few thousand flown. Other works do not confirm that the airlift became much less intense after August. Luftwaffe data suggests a fairly stable rate of transport. One source claims that in August there were 6,543 men flown during 353 missions, while in September the respective figures were 5,455 and 324. However, these figures are for Moroccan troops only.

Command

The operation was a complex and previously unheard of logistical undertaking, which involved refueling (purchase of fuel, transport, storage, pumping), repair and maintenance (staff, spare parts procurement, workshop availability, tools), handling of troops (transport, accommodation, assembly, waiting, onboarding and offboarding) and air-traffic management. None of the sources consulted provides information on command chain or division of duties. Some sources credit Alfredo Kindelán, who was nominated by Franco as the head of his air force on July 30, with the organisation and execution of the entire airlift. However, Kindelán spent the first days of the coup in Gibraltar before moving to Morocco. In early August he set up his headquarters in Seville. In his memoirs, Kindelán is not very eloquent and dedicates rather little attention to the airlift. Back in Germany, the Luftwaffe's logistics were co-ordinated by General Helmuth Wilberg. The man to command the detachment sent to Spain was initially Major Alexander von Scheele, who was later followed by Colonel Walter Warlimont. The Italian air detachment was from the onset led by Colonel Ruggero Bonomi. However, both Scheele and Bonomi commanded entire air fleets, sent by both dictators to Spain, including bombing and fighter operations over the peninsula. The officer commanding the German share of the airlift operation was Rudolf Freiherr von Moreau.

Official status

German and Italian aircraft were dispatched to Franco on a secret mission. Italian pilots and their machines were officially incorporated into the Spanish Foreign Legion and posed as part of it. The Germans set up HISMA, a company supposed to provide transport services between Morocco and Spain; all Ju 52 were officially operated by this entity. Luftwaffe pilots travelled in plain clothes and if detained, they were to pose as tourists with the Reisegesellschaft Union, part of the Nazi leisure organisation. Both German and Italian machines were re-painted and stripped of their national symbols. Despite all the effort, Fascist and Nazi assistance soon ceased to be a secret. During the flight from Sardinia to Morocco, 3 SM 81 machines either crash-landed or mistakenly landed on French territory. The investigation soon revealed the nature of their mission. British intelligence got wind of German assistance when they intercepted a message from the Spanish consul in Tangier; in early August the British vice-consul in Tetuan reported 20 “large aircraft” and German anti-Nazi workers in Hamburg provided more news. Later in August, the Communist propagandist Arthur Koestler saw foreign airmen in Seville, though there was no proof they were military. By September it was already widely known that German and Italian aircraft and men were heavily involved in transporting Franco’s troops to the peninsula.

End of airlift

On September 29, 1936, the Nationalist force led by the cruiser Canarias engaged and defeated the Republican fleet during the Battle of Cabo Spartel. Since then the Republican naval command no longer attempted to control the straits and withdrew its warships to their naval bases, where they mostly remained idle. The Nationalists immediately resumed their transport of troops from Morocco to Andalusia by sea. Following some 10 days it was concluded that the maritime route across the straits was fully safe, and that there was no longer a need for an airlift. It was effectively terminated on October 11, 1936. Sources provide conflicting figures as to the number of troops and load of equipment transported in total during the entire exercise, which lasted for 85 days between July 19 and October 11. The figure usually referred to is “over 20,000”, but Kindelán claims there were only 14,000 men. There are also more vague estimates of “between 14,000 and 23,000 men”. The total load of materiel transported is at times given as 270 tons, though other sources refer to this figure as equipment carried by the Luftwaffe only. Others quote the figure as 400 tons. At least 36 artillery pieces were transported. Luftwaffe is credited as the key component of the airlift, responsible for transport of some 13,000 troops and 270 tons, though some sources claim the Germans carried 17,000 soldiers.

Assessment

The operation of flying troops and equipment from Morocco to Andalusia is often referred to as “the first airlift in military history” or similarly. Some authors noted it as “major innovation in air doctrine”, though others when discussing innovations introduced during the Spanish civil war did not mention it. Some credit the Nationalist command in Morocco for “resourcefulness”. It is often maintained that the airlift turned the odds in favor of the insurgents. One author underlines that “it is no exaggeration to say that the airlift saved the Nationalist cause in the summer of 1936”, and another maintains that the airlift was “decisive factor in giving Franco the advantage in the struggle for power”. Hitler himself claimed most of the credit; in 1942 he commented that “Franco ought to erect a monument to the glory of the Junkers 52”. This thesis is not infrequently repeated by present-day historians. One author claims that “Mussolini and Hitler turned a coup d’etat going wrong into a bloody and prolonged civil war”. Another notes that “Nazi and Fascist military aid was considerable and decisive for Franco's victory”. In popular narratives the thesis is even more bold: “Ju-52: German transport aircraft which enabled Franco to win the Civil War”. However, there are historians who claim that already prior to arrival of German and Italian aircraft Franco had enough soldiers flown to control the situation in Andalusia.

See also
 Spanish coup of July 1936
 Junkers Ju 52
 Savoia-Marchetti SM.81 Pipistrello

Footnotes

Further reading
 Michael Alpert, Franco and the Condor Legion: The Spanish Civil War in the Air, London 2019, 
 James S. Corum, The Luftwaffe: Creating the Operational Air War, 19181940, Lawrence 1997, 
 Alfredo Kindelán, Mis cuadernos de guerra, Barcelona 1982, 
 Guido Mattioli, L'aviazione legionaria in Spagna, vol. 1, Roma 2016,

External links
 anti-revisionist historian Angel Vinas on role of the airlift
 amateur historian Javier Arrimada on aviation during first days of civil war

Airlifts
Spanish Civil War